Zenzevatka is a rural locality (a selo) and the administrative center of Zenzevatvskoye Rural Settlement, Olkhovsky District, Volgograd Oblast, Russia. The population was 1,604 as of 2017. There are 14 streets.

History 
According to the Historical and Geographical Dictionary of Saratov Province, it was settled by Russian serfs in the 1770s or in the early 19th century.

Geography 
Zenzevatka is located 8 km southwest of Olkhovka (the district's administrative centre) by road. Olkhovka is the nearest rural locality.

References 

1770s establishments in the Russian Empire
Populated places established in the 1770s
Rural localities in Olkhovsky District
Tsaritsynsky Uyezd